Alphonso Barto (May 24, 1834November 4, 1899) was a Minnesota legislator and the seventh Lieutenant Governor of Minnesota.

Life and career

Barto was born in Hinesburg, Vermont, in 1834. His father William Barto was from a French family which had emigrated to the United States before the American Revolution (their surname was originally spelled "Barteau"). His mother Mary Barto (née Gage) was a descendant of English settlers. Barto moved to Ferrisburgh, Vermont, to attend school. In 1854 he married Harriet E. Hitchcock. Shortly thereafter the two moved west, settling in Elgin, Illinois, where he ran a farm and later read law.

During the American Civil War Barto enlisted in the 52nd Illinois Volunteer Infantry Regiment, serving for three years and mustering out with the rank of captain in October 1865. His first wife Harriet died shortly before Barto returned from his service. Barto resumed his life in Elgin, winning election as treasurer of Kane County, Illinois, for one term and remarrying in 1866 to Charlotte "Lottie" A. Allen.

In 1869 Barto moved to Sauk Centre, Minnesota, to pursue his law career. In 1871 he was elected to the Minnesota House of Representatives, serving a term of two years. In 1873 he won election as lieutenant governor under Cushman K. Davis. While he did not hold a state office again, Barto served in various local offices in and near Saint Cloud, Minnesota, and was appointed as a regent of the University of Minnesota by Governor David Marston Clough. He also remained active with the Republican Party as an organizer and delegate to the 1884 Republican National Convention. Barto died on November 4, 1899, in Saint Cloud, Minnesota.

References

1834 births
1899 deaths
People from Hinesburg, Vermont
Lieutenant Governors of Minnesota
Republican Party members of the Minnesota House of Representatives
People of Illinois in the American Civil War
Minnesota lawyers
19th-century American politicians
American lawyers admitted to the practice of law by reading law
People from Sauk Centre, Minnesota
19th-century American lawyers